San Saba Independent School District is a public school district based in San Saba, Texas (USA).

In addition to San Saba, the district also serves part of the community of Bend.

The district's mascot is the Armadillo.

In 2009, the school district was rated "academically acceptable" by the Texas Education Agency.

Schools
San Saba High School (Grades 9-12)
San Saba Middle (Grades 5-8)
San Saba Elementary (Grades PK-4)

References

External links
San Saba ISD

School districts in San Saba County, Texas